Zhao Ti (1871–1933) was a Chinese general of the late Qing and early Republican period of China. In 1920, he was military governor of Henan.

References

1871 births
1933 deaths
Qing dynasty generals
Republic of China warlords from Henan
Politicians from Zhumadian
Empire of China (1915–1916)